East Street is a busy street market in Walworth in South London.

East Street may also refer to:

 East Street (Bridport) railway station, a disused railway station in Dorset
 East Street (CDOT station), a proposed bus station in Connecticut
 "East Street" (Children in Need), a crossover episode between Coronation Street and EastEnders, broadcast as part of Children in Need 2010
 East Street, Fremantle, Western Australia

See also
E Street (disambiguation)
East Avenue (disambiguation)